The 3rd Lagos State House of Assembly is the legislative branch of the Lagos State Government inaugurated on January 14, 1992, and the assembly ran its course till June 1, 1999. 
The assembly was unicameral with 41 representatives elected from each constituencies of the state.
The Speaker of the 3rd Legislative Assembly was Rt. Hon Shakirudeen Kinyomi and the Deputy speaker was Hon Rasheed Adebowale.
The 4th Assembly was inaugurated on June 2, 2003, with the emergence of  Adeleke Mamora as Speaker.

References

1979 establishments in Nigeria
State lower houses in Nigeria
Lagos State House of Assembly